Janardana Swami Temple is a 2000+ year-old temple situated in the municipality of Varkala city in Trivandrum.  It is also known as Varkala Temple. Janardana Swami is a form of Lord Vishnu. It is a very well known temple in Kerala about 10.9 km west of Kallambalam on NH 66 near sea, 25 km north of Thiruvananthapuram city, 8 km south of famous backwater destination Kappil and 2 km from Varkala Railway Station,14 km north west of Attingal municipality. It is situated near the Arabian sea shore.It is referred to as Dakshin Kashi (Benares of the south). The temple is located close to the Varkala Beach, which is considered to have medicinal properties since the waters wash the nearby medicinal plants. It is also an important Ayurveda treatment center. The temple has an ancient bell removed from a shipwreck, donated by the captain of the Dutch vessel which sank near Varkala without causing any casualties.

Varkala, a sea side emerging city of Trivandrum, also known as Janardanapuram or Udayamarthandapuram or Balit is a sacred pilgrim center situated in Trivandrum and is famous for its ancient temple of Vishnu, who is popularly called as Janardana. In Sri Maha Bhavatham, mention is made that Balarama, the elder brother of Sri Krishna, visited this shrine during this pilgrimage to the Kanyakumari temple and a few other temples in the south. It is also known as ‘Gaya of the South'. Varkala has many attractions peculiar to the place and draws hundreds of pilgrims and visitors all the year round.

Sage Narada, after paying his respects to Lord Narayana, left Vaikuntam to see Brahma. Enraptured by the sweet music of Narada, Narayana followed him unobserved. When Narada reached Brahmaloka, Brahma saw Narayana following his son Narada and offered salutations to him, at which Vishnu, realizing the awkward situation, suddenly disappeared. Brahma found that the person whom he had revered was his own son, Narada. The 'Prajapathis' who were laughing at this incident were cursed by Brahma that they would be born on earth and suffer the miseries of human beings. Narada advised them to perform penance at the place he himself would select for them. Narada threw his ‘Valkalam' (bark upper garment) into the air and at the place where it fell down, they consecrated a temple for Janardanaswamy (a name of Vishnu). Hence the name Varkala is a corruption of ‘Valkala', but the name came into prominent usage.

The temple of Sri Janardana is situated on the summit of a table-land adjoining the sea. It is located on one of the hill-tops, which is reached by a long and wearisome flight of steps and one feels tired on arriving at the feet of the Lord. At the entrance to the inner shrine are the idols of Hanuman and Garuda on either side and in the main shrine is the idol of Sri. Janardana with Sri Devi and Bhoo Devi. The temple of Janardana is a fine example of Kerala art and architecture. The circular ‘Sanctum sanctorum" surmounted by a conical dome of copper sheets, the square ‘mandapa' with beautiful wooden carvings of Navagrahas on the ceiling and copper-plated roof over it, the quadrangular enclosures (prakara) around them, a hall containing a ‘bali peetha' in front of the inner temple are the characteristic features of Kerala style of architecture. The construction period of this temple saw the rise of highly embellished temple. one of the inscriptions indicates that the temple was improved during the reign of Umayamma Rani, who ruled this region during 1677-84 A.D. The main idol has a striking appearance with four arms having all the attributes of Vishnu. In the south-western corner and on the north-eastern side of the outer enclosure are the shrines of Sasta and Shiva with Nandi.

To the scientist, Varkala is well known from its geological formation and has been inspected and examined carefully by hordes or geologists and volumes of interesting literature are carefully preserved in the archives of the Government of India . Besides the enchanging sea-view, there is the backwater journey by canal hewn out of the tremendous heights of hills on either side of it. The vegetation on either side of the canal, rising in height is a magnificent sight, has given rise to a series of springs form which gushes out sparkling water throughout the year. The water in supported to have medicinal properties which cure certain ailments. Even a single bath is a tonic which no traveller or visitor should miss

History
In times of yore, Lord Brahma came to the earth to perform a Yaga (fire Sacrifice). He did it in the present Varkala. He was so much immersed in doing Yaga that he forgot his job of creation. Lord Vishnu came to Varkala to remind Lord Brahma about it in the form of a very old man. The Brahmins assisting Lord Brahma, received the old man and gave him food. But whatever he ate, his hunger was not satiated. Lord Brahma’s assistants went and told him about it. Then Lord Brahma could understand that the guest was Lord Vishnu himself. He immediately came near Lord Vishnu and found him trying to eat Aabhojanam. Lord Brahma then prevented Lord Vishnu from eating it and told him - "Lord, if you eat it, then the final deluge will swallow this world." Lord Vishnu then requested Lord Brahma to stop the Yaga and recommence his job of creation. He also showed him his 'Viswaroopa'. After this one day Sage Narada followed by Lord Vishnu was walking in the sky over Varkala. Lord Brahma who came there saluted Lord Vishnu. The nine Prajapathis to whom only sage Narada was visible laughed at Lord Brahma. Because they thought that Lord Brahma was saluting his own son Sage Narada. Then Lord Brahma corrected them. They felt sad at having committed a sinful deed. Lord Brahma told them that the proper place to pray for their redemption would be shown to them by sage Narada. Sage Narada threw the Valkala (deer’s skin) that he was wearing towards the earth. It fell in the present Varkala. The Prajapathis wanted a pond to do the atonement. Sage Narada requested lord Vishnu, who made a pond there, using his Chakra (wheel). The Prajapathis did thapas there and were pardoned for their sins. It is believed that the 'Devas' constructed a temple of Lord Vishnu there and were worshiping the Lord Janardhana.

But this temple got dilapidated. At that time, several centuries ago, the then Pandya king was affected by a ghost. He went on a pilgrimage but nowhere did he find any cure. When he came to the present day Varkala, he saw the remnants of the dilapidated temple by the side the sea. He prayed to the Lord saying that he would rebuild the temple there. The next day he had a dream. It told him that the following day he should go to the sea and stand near the dilapidated temple. Nearby he would see a huge amount of flowers floating in the sea and that if he searches there he would get an idol. He was instructed to make a golden hand and attach it to the idol and build a temple round it. The present Janardhana idol was recovered from the sea by him. He built the temple and laid down the rules for maintenance of the temple. The idol of Janardhana has Aabhojana in its right hand.

People believe that over years this hand is raising slowly. The day that the idol is able to eat the aabhojana from his right hand, the world will face the great deluge. There are small temples of Lord Shiva, Ganapathi, Sastha and Naga Devatha in this temple. The idol is always dressed in sandal and flowers either in the form of Janardhana, Narasimha, Venugopala or Mohini. Ashtami Rohini, the birthday of Lord Krishna, which comes in the month of Chingam (August–September) is celebrated as a festival here. On the southern side of the temple two bells are tied. There is a story about it as well. One Dutch ship was passing this way and suddenly the ship refused to move in spite of all efforts. The people told the captain of the ship to tie a bell in the Janardhana temple. It seems the captain and his assistant came ashore and tied the bells. As soon as they tied the bells, the ship started moving. The names inscribed in the bell are 'Peter von Belson' and 'Michelle Evarald'. People believe that if worship of ancestors is done in this temple, then they would be pleased. Possibly because of this the Janardhana is also called Pithru Mokshakan.

Festival
Every year, in the month of Meenam (March–April), a ten-day Arattu festival is celebrated at the Janardhana Swamy Temple in Kerala's beach town of Varkala. The festival starts with a Kodiyettam flag hoisting ceremony, and ends with a procession of five decorated elephants through the streets. During the fourth and fifth days of the festival, the celebrations include all night long performances such as traditional Kathakali dancing. The arattu (holy bath) of the Lord is conducted on Uthram day in the Arabian sea on the back of the temple. Along with this festival, the days of the appearance of Lord Vishnu's avatars (e.g.: Rama Navami, Ashtami Rohini, Narasimha Jayanthi), Karkidaka vavu  (Amavasya day in the month of Karkidakam, which comes in July or August), and Vaikuntha Ekadashi are also celebrated in the temple. The days of Thiruvonam star, Ekadashi and Thursdays are also considered important, since according to popular custom, these days are dedicated to Lord Vishnu.

The Deity
The presiding deity of this temple is Sri Janarthana Swami. The deity is found in a standing position facing towards the east. His right hand is in position as if he is performing "Aachamanam". His right hand is raised towards his mouth and legends say that if his hand goes nearer to his mouth, the world will come to an end. It is believed to happen at the end of the Kali Yuga.

Legends
According to the legend, attracted by the music from Narada’s Veena, Lord Vishnu started following him and reached Satyaloka. Seeing Lord Vishnu, Brahma prostrated before him. Lord Vishnu soon realized that he has reached Satyaloka but did not realize that Lord Brahma is prostrating before him and left back to Vaikunta. It seemed as if Lord Brahma is falling towards the feet of Narada and all the present 'Devas' laughed. This made Brahma angry and he cursed Devas to be born as humans in the earth. Devas repented their folly and begged to be forgiven. Brahma replied that the curse would be withdrawn when they do a penance to please Lord Janardana. Devas asked where that place is where they should do the penance. Brahma told them that the place where Sage Narada’s ‘Vastra’ falls will be the sacred place. It is Varkala where his ‘Vastra’ fell and Devas did the penance accordingly to get relieved of the curse.

According to Mahabharata, Balabhadran has visited the place for pilgrimage.

Rituals

Offering obeisances to the departed souls and forefathers is a very important ritual. Four poojas are conducted in a day by the priest. The chief priest is a Tulu Brahmin, who should not be a native of the place where the temple exists. Sub-deities are Ganapathi, Shastha, Ananthan (Nagam) Shiva, Chandikesha, and Hanuman. A ten-day festival with Arattu is conducted on the Malayalam month of Meenam on the day of Uthram.

Geography

See also
 List of Hindu temples in Kerala
 Temples of Kerala

References

External links
 https://www.hindhu.news

 Vedic Talks - Sree Janardana Swami Temple - Varkala

Hindu temples in Thiruvananthapuram district
Purana temples of Vishnu
Varkala
Mahavishnu temples in Kerala